Pares, Parès or Parés may refer to:

Pares, Antigua and Barbuda
Pares (food), a dish originating in the Philippines
Pares (butterfly), a genus of butterflies in the subtribe Moncina
Portal de Archivos Españoles (PARES), a Spanish government archive service

People with the name
 Arnoldo Parés, Argentine boxer who competed in the 1948 Summer Olympics
 Bernard Pares (1867–1949), English historian and academic
Francisco Parés Alicea, Puerto Rican accountant and government official
 Geoffrey Pares, Australian former tennis player
 Jaime Parés (born 1958), Spanish sports shooter
 Luis Parés (active from 2006), Venezuelan/Italian classical pianist
 Norman Pares (1857-1936), English canon and amateur footballer
 Michel Parès (1887-1966), French politician
 Pablo Parés (born 1978), Argentine film director, actor, film producer, cinematographer, screenwriter and film editor
 Pablo Guzmán Parés (born 1987), Puerto Rican volleyball player
 Philippe Parès (1901-1979), French composer
 Richard Pares (1902-1958), British historian
 Susan Jellicoe (1907-1986), British plant enthusiast, writer, editor and photographer
 Víctor Parés (active from 1983), Puerto Rican politician
 John Pares Craine (before 1959 - 1977), Episcopalian bishop of Indianapolis

See also
 Doce Pares, a martial art
 "No pares", a 2006 song by Mexican band RBD
 Primus inter pares, a Latin phrase meaning "first among equals"
 Sala Parés, an art gallery in Barcelona, Spain
Pare (disambiguation)